The 12921/12922 Flying Ranee  is a superfast express train belonging to Indian Railways that runs between  (MMCT) and  (ST) in India. It is a daily service. It operates as train number 12922 from Surat to Mumbai Central and as train number 12921 in the reverse direction.

Coaches

Flying Ranee presently has 2 AC Chair Car, 3 General second class, 1 First Class & 12 Double Decker non-AC coaches. This train would earlier carry a pantry car but this has been removed and replaced with a Second Chair Car coach.

Service

Flying Raneeis a classic train that started in India in its Pre-Independence phase. This classic train started operating from the year 1906. But in the year 1914 on 24 April, it was discontinued. The Flying Ranee was restarted on 1 May 1937 as a weekend special. It ran between 1937 and 1939 when it was discontinued due to World War II. Since then, it had been discontinued and restarted several times. It finally resumed operations on 1 November 1950 and has been running ever since. On 18 December 1979, double-decker cars were added to the Flying Ranee's rake. Presently it is a daily service.

It covers the distance of 263 kilometres in 4 hours 40 minutes as 12922 Flying Ranee (56.35 km/hr) and 4 hours 40 minutes as 12921 Flying Ranee (55.37 km/hr).

Traction

Dual-traction WCAM-1 locomotive usually hauls the train between Mumbai and Surat. Western Railways completed DC Electric Conversion to AC on 5 February 2012.

It is now regularly hauled by a Vadodara-based WAP-7 or WAP-5 or WAP-4E locomotive.

Time Table

12922 Flying Ranee leaves Surat at 05:05 AM IST every day and reaches Mumbai Central at 09:45 AM IST the same day.

12921 Flying Ranee leaves Mumbai Central at 17:55 PM IST every day and reaches Surat at 22:35 PM IST the same day.

Route & Halts

The important halts of the train are:

Gallery

As per new timetable eefective December 2021 Flying Ranee will be given a halt at Udvada station both ways.

Transport in Mumbai
Transport in Surat
Double-decker trains of India
Rail transport in Gujarat
Express trains in India
Rail transport in Maharashtra
Railway services introduced in 1937